Gun Creek is a major left (north) tributary of the Bridge River in the Interior of British Columbia, Canada.  Located at its mouth into today's Carpenter Lake was Minto City, a gold mining town established in the 1930s and destroyed by a flood in the later 1940s.  Carpenter Lake is a reservoir of the Bridge River Hydroelectric Project.  Gun Lake is part of the creek's basin but is not on the creek itself, but connected to it by a short stream from its northeastern end.

Rivers of British Columbia
Bridge River Country